A roll  is a small, usually round or oblong individual loaf of bread served as a meal accompaniment (eaten plain or with butter). Rolls can be served and eaten whole or are also commonly cut and filled – the result of doing so is considered a sandwich in American English and in Britain.

Europe
Rolls are common in Eastern, Northern, and Western Europe. Even in the same languages rolls are known by a variety of names. Some European languages have many local and dialectal terms for bread rolls. These include German language diminutives of Brot (bread) in most of western and central Germany (where they are called Brötchen) and in Switzerland (where they are called Brötli). Other German language terms include Rundstück ("round piece") in Hamburg and Schleswig-Holstein; Semmel in Austria and southern Bavaria; Weck in much of Baden-Württemberg, Franconia and Saarland; Schrippe in Berlin and parts of Brandenburg. Some of these names reappear in other European languages as well, for example as zsemle in Hungarian, or rundstykker ("round pieces") in Danish and Norwegian.
In The Netherlands they are called broodje

"Small bread" is also found as Italian panino,  which also commonly denotes a stuffed small bread roll. The Kaisersemmel reappears in Italy as the Michetta or Rosetta.  In Swedish, a bread roll is a (frukost) bullar ("(breakfast) buns"), franskbrödbullar ("french bread bun") or simply fralla ("bun"), comfort food eaten with butter and any kind of topping (marmalade, cheese, ham, salami) for special weekend breakfasts. The Doppelweck or Doppelbrötchen is a type of bread roll originating from the Saarland which consists of two rolls joined together side-by-side before baking.

There are many terms for a bread roll within the United Kingdom depending on region. These names include roll, and for a minority of the population (usually concentrated in specific regions) bap, barm cake, batch, breadcake, bun, cob, teacake and muffin. 

A variety of rolls are found in Europe, from white rolls made with wheat flour, to dark rolls containing mostly rye flour. Many variants include spices, such as coriander and cumin, or nuts. Also common are bread rolls containing or garnished with whole seeds such as sesame, poppy, pumpkin or sunflower.

Preparation
Below are the steps in the preparation of a Czech bread roll called "houska".

See also

 List of bread rolls
 Bagel
 Boule (bread)
 Breakfast roll
 Chicken fillet roll
 Croissant
 List of baked goods
 List of breads
 List of bread dishes
 List of buns
 Ovelgönne bread roll
 Scuffler

References

External links
 

German cuisine
Breads
British breads